David John Young is an American diplomat who is the United States Ambassador to Malawi.

Education 

Young earned his Bachelor of Arts in journalism from the University of Missouri; a Diploma from Trinity College Dublin; and a Master of Divinity from Boston University School of Theology and a Master of International Affairs from the Frederick S. Pardee School of Global Studies also of Boston University.

Career 

Young is a career member of the Senior Foreign Service; he was elevated to class of Minister-Counselor on January 30, 2018. His assignments have included being a Pearson Fellow; a Public Affairs Officer at the U.S. Embassy in Guatemala; and Director of the Office of International Religious Freedom in the Bureau of Democracy and Human Rights at the State Department. He has also served as deputy director in the Office of the Special Envoy for Sudan & South Sudan, and he also served as executive assistant to the Under Secretary for Democracy and Global Affairs at the State Department. Previously he served as Chargé d’Affaires, a.i. at the U.S. Embassy in Pretoria, South Africa and Deputy Chief of Mission at the U.S. Embassy in Abuja, Nigeria. From 2020 to 2021, he served as the Chargé d’Affaires at the U.S. Embassy in Lusaka, Zambia.

Ambassador to Malawi
On August 4, 2021, President Joe Biden nominated Young to be the next United States Ambassador to Malawi. On September 30, 2021, a hearing on his nomination was held before the Senate Foreign Relations Committee. On October 19, 2021, his nomination was reported favorably out of committee. On March 3, 2022, the Senate confirmed Young by voice vote. He presented his credentials to President of Malawi Lazarus Chakwera on May 5, 2022.

Personal life 

Born and raised in Kansas City, Missouri, he and his wife Diane Weisz Young have two children, Paul and Sarah.

See also
List of ambassadors of the United States

References

Living people
Year of birth missing (living people)
20th-century American diplomats
21st-century American diplomats
Ambassadors of the United States to Malawi
Alumni of Trinity College Dublin
Boston University alumni
Boston University School of Theology alumni
People from Kansas City, Missouri
United States Foreign Service personnel
University of Missouri alumni